"Miss Nothing" is a song by American rock band The Pretty Reckless from their debut studio album, Light Me Up (2010). It was released on August 18, 2010, as the album's second single.

Music video

The music video, directed by Meiert Avis, was released on July 20, 2010 on Vevo and was shot with a Canon EOS 5D Mark II. It begins with ten people (Taylor Momsen included) sitting around a table in an imitation of the Last Supper. Momsen (as Mary Magdalene) starts to crawl over the table, tipping over the food and spilling the drinks whilst singing as the rest watch. Later she starts ripping apart a bouquet of roses. It ends with several "famous" people having joined in surrounding the table with Momsen on it, most noticeably John Lennon and Jimi Hendrix playing guitars and Charlie Chaplin. The band confirmed it is set after the death of Christ.

Live performances

"Miss Nothing" has been performed live several times, first on "This Morning Show" on August 20, 2010, then on "The 5:19 Show" on August 20, 2010. These performances were followed with more two on "Radio 1 Live Lounge" and on "Unplugged for NME", on August 23, 2010 and August 25, respectively.

Background
Lead singer Taylor Momsen said the song was about "a loved one passing, losing your identity and your mind", and described it as "not the happiest of songs". She also confirmed in an interview that the lyrics were censored because the word "cunt" is in the lyrics and that people did not realize she is saying the word. It is the only song on the album that has any swearing in the lyrics.

Track listing
UK digital EP and limited-edition 7" picture disc
"Miss Nothing"
"Make Me Wanna Die" (acoustic version)

Credits and personnel
Credits adapted from the liner notes of Light Me Up.

The Pretty Reckless
 Taylor Momsen – vocals
 Ben Phillips – guitar
 Jamie Perkins – drums

Additional personnel
 Kato Khandwala – production, engineering, mixing, guitar, bass, percussion, programming, string arrangement
 John Bender – backing vocals
 Michael "Mitch" Milan – engineering assistance
 Jon Cohan – drum tech

Charts

Release history

References

External links
 Music video at YouTube
 Making of the music video at YouTube

2010 singles
2010 songs
Interscope Records singles
Music videos directed by Meiert Avis
The Pretty Reckless songs
Songs written by Taylor Momsen